Making History is an American sitcom created by Julius Sharpe for the Fox Broadcasting Company. Executive-produced by Phil Lord and Christopher Miller, created and written by Julius Sharpe, the show stars Adam Pally, Leighton Meester, and Yassir Lester.

Plot
The series follows three friends from two different centuries as they experience the thrill of time travel and the unexpected results of it.

Cast
 Adam Pally as Daniel "Dan" Chambers, janitor
 Leighton Meester as Deborah Revere, the eldest daughter of Paul Revere and his first wife Sarah Orne
 Yassir Lester as Chris Parrish, a history professor
 John Gemberling as John Hancock
 Neil Casey as Sam Adams

Recurring
 Brett Gelman as Paul Revere
 Tim Robinson as Al Capone
 Stephanie Escajeda as Mae Capone

Production

Development
Originally planned for 13 episodes, Fox reduced the show to 9 episodes in October 2016. Making History was a joint production by Julius Sharpe International Petroleum & Writing, Lord Miller Productions and 20th Century Fox Television, and syndicated by 20th Television.

Casting
On February 24, 2016, Adam Pally was cast as Dan. On March 9, 2016, Leighton Meester was cast as Deborah. On March 17, 2016, Yassir Lester was cast as Chris.

On June 8, 2016, John Gemberling and Neil Casey (playing the roles of John Hancock and Sam Adams) were announced to join as series regulars.

Cancellation
On May 11, 2017, the series was cancelled after one season.

Reception
On Rotten Tomatoes the series has a rating of 92% based on 25 reviews, with an average rating of 6.9/10. The site's critical consensus reads, "A high concept gone silly, Making History makes the grade with contemporary humor for historical themes and a funny, cartoonish execution of a serialized plot." On Metacritic, the series has a score of 64 out of 100, based on 24 critics, indicating "generally favorable reviews".

Episodes

References

External links
 
 
 

2010s American comic science fiction television series
2010s American single-camera sitcoms
2010s American time travel television series
2017 American television series debuts
2017 American television series endings
Cultural depictions of Al Capone
Cultural depictions of John Hancock
Cultural depictions of Paul Revere
Cultural depictions of Samuel Adams
English-language television shows
Fox Broadcasting Company original programming
Television series by 20th Century Fox Television
Television series set in the 1770s
Television series set in 2016
Television shows set in Massachusetts